Michael D. Kohn (born December 28, 1954 in Plainfield, New Jersey) is a founding partner of the Washington, D.C. law firm Kohn, Kohn & Colapinto, where he specializes in whistleblower protection law.

Biography
A graduate of Rutgers University (B.S. in biology), he received his Juris Doctor degree from the Antioch School of Law. After graduating from Antioch, he served as Director of Legal Ethics for the Government Accountability Project. Kohn co-founded the law firm now known as Kohn, Kohn & Colapinto with his brother Stephen in 1988.

The original focus of the law firm was defending nuclear power industry whistleblowers, although the firm serves whistleblowers in other areas. KKC's most notable client was Linda Tripp.

Kohn serves as president and general counsel for the National Whistleblower Center and is an attorney-trustee for the National Whistleblower Legal Defense and Education Fund.

Publications

References

1954 births
American lawyers
American legal writers
Writers from Washington, D.C.
Lawyers from Washington, D.C.
Living people
Rutgers University alumni
David A. Clarke School of Law alumni